Zohrana is a genus of leaf beetles in the subfamily Eumolpinae. It is known from Africa. It is also sometimes known as Zohranus.

The genus was originally named Liniscus by Édouard Lefèvre in 1885; however, this name was preoccupied by Liniscus Dujardin, 1844 (a nematode genus), so it was renamed to Zohrana by N. A. Aslam in 1968.

Species
 Zohrana fasciolata (Fairmaire, 1893)
 Zohrana koulmannensis (Selman, 1963)
 Zohrana puncticollis (Bryant, 1959)
 Zohrana rhodesiana (Achard, 1925)
 Zohrana sansibarica (Lefèvre, 1885)
 Zohrana semistriata (Pic, 1950)
 Zohrana semiviridis (Pic, 1939)
 Zohrana substriatipennis (Pic, 1939)
 Zohrana substriata (Weise, 1909)
 Zohrana sudanica (Weise, 1926)
 Zohrana testacea (Pic, 1939)
 Zohrana usambarica (Weise, 1909)

References

Eumolpinae
Chrysomelidae genera
Beetles of Africa